The Unfairground is a 2007 album by Kevin Ayers, recorded with members of Ladybug Transistor, Teenage Fanclub, Neutral Milk Hotel, Gorky's Zygotic Mynci and Roxy Music. It was his sixteenth studio LP and his first new set of recordings in fifteen years, as well as the last album released before his death in 2013. It was recorded in New York City, Tucson, Arizona, London and Glasgow. It debuted at #14 in the UK Indie Album chart.

The Unfairground deals with themes of love, loss and the passing of time, and it has received strong critical endorsements for its author's ruminations on his tumultuous life. Ayers stated in a 2007 Sunday Times interview that it is “very much a reflective album: lost love, lost feelings, lost sensibilities. I had to include some of my blood, sweat and tears – if you are going to be honest, it can’t be avoided.”

Track listing

Personnel

Musicians
 Kevin Ayers – guitar, vocals
 Gary Olson – trumpet, producer
 San Fadyl – drums
 Jeff Baron – guitar
 Norman Blake – guitar, backing vocals
 Francis MacDonald – drums
 Julian Koster – singing saw
 Candie Payne – backing vocals
 Euros Childs – backing vocals
 Bill Wells – bass
 Joe McGinty – keyboards
 Phil Manzanera – guitar
 Robbie McIntosh – guitar
 Hugh Hopper – bass
 Daisy Martey – backing vocals
 Tucson Philharmonia – strings
 Bridget St. John – vocals
 Dave McGowan – pedal steel
 Heather McIntosh – bass, cello
 Kellie Sutherland – brass
 Tara Shackell – brass
 Isobel Knowles – brass
 Gus Franklin – brass
 Graham Henderson – accordion
 Peter Nicholson – cello
 Francis Reader – backing vocals
 The Wyattron

Technical
 Peter Henderson – producer
 Timothy Shepard – producer, artwork, executive producer
 Bernard MacMahon – executive producer

References

External links
Kevin Ayers Returns With Help From Roxy, Ladybug, Architecture by Paul Thompson and Amy Phillips (Pitchfork Jul 31, 2007) link
Indie Stars Guest On Rock Legend's First Album In 15 Years (NME Aug 10, 2007) link
The Father of the Underground by Garth Cartwright (Daily Telegraph Aug 30 2007) link
The Unsung Hero of Psychedelia by Lisa Verrico (The Sunday Times Sep 2, 2007) link
Soft Centered by Pierre Perrone (The Independent Sep 11 2007) link
Album Review by Andy Gill (Uncut Sept 2007) link
Album Review by Mike Barnes (Mojo Sept 2007) link
 Kevin Ayers by Mike Atkinson (Stylus Oct 23 2007) link
Kevin Ayers and Robert Wyatt by Simon Reynolds (Reynoldsretro Dec 14 2007) link

2007 albums
Kevin Ayers albums
Albums produced by Kevin Ayers
LO-MAX Records albums